Balkhab, also known as Tarkhoj,  is a village and district capital of Balkhab District in Sar-e Pol Province, in northern Afghanistan.

See also 
 Balkhab District
 Balkhab River
 Balkhab uprising
 Sar-e Pol Province

References 

Populated places in Sar-e Pol Province